Reuven Shiloah (December 1909 – 1959) was the first Director of the Mossad from 1949 to 1953.

Biography
Reuven Zaslani (later Shiloah) was born in Ottoman-ruled Jerusalem.  His father was a rabbi. Shiloah married Betty Borden of New York in 1936.

Shiloah's involvement in political and defense matters commenced before the establishment of the State of Israel. He was a close friend of David Ben-Gurion.  Before the 1948 Arab-Israeli War Shiloah obtained the invasion plans of the Arab League, and he began building relationships with other intelligence agencies, particularly in the West.  At the urging of Shiloah, Prime Minister Ben-Gurion created the "Central Institute for Coordination" (Mossad) in December 1949 and appointed Shiloah as its first Director.  However, it was not until April 1, 1951 that the Mossad became operational under Shiloah because bureaucratic fighting had delayed Ben-Gurion's initial order.  After his tenure at the Mossad Shiloah worked in the Israeli Embassy in Washington DC and continued serving as an advisor.

References

Further reading

1909 births
1959 deaths
Directors of the Mossad
Jews in Ottoman Palestine
Jews in Mandatory Palestine